Katrina Jane Allen  (born 24 February 1966) is an Australian politician and former medical researcher who was a member of the House of Representatives from 2019 until 2022. She is a member of the Liberal Party and represented the Division of Higgins in Victoria.

Early life
Allen grew up in country New South Wales and went to boarding school at Melbourne Girls Grammar. Her father was born on Ocean Island in the British colony of Gilbert and Ellice Islands (present-day Kiribati). She held British citizenship by descent until March 2019 when she renounced it to run for parliament.

Allen studied medicine at Monash University, also undertaking research at the University of Cambridge, and subsequently trained as a doctor at the Alfred Hospital. She completed a Ph.D. at the University of Melbourne in 2002. Her doctoral thesis, titled "Liver cell transplantation using a mouse model of Wilson's disease", was on the use of liver cell transplantation to treat Wilson's disease.

Allen was one of eleven MPs in the 46th Parliament of Australia to hold a PhD, the others being Jim Chalmers, Fiona Martin, Anne Aly, Andrew Leigh, Daniel Mulino, Jess Walsh, Adam Bandt, Mehreen Faruqi, Anne Webster and Helen Haines.

Career
From 1998, Allen was employed as a paediatric allergist and gastroenterologist at the Royal Children's Hospital in Melbourne. After completing a PhD at the University of Melbourne in the development of liver cell transplantation as an alternative to whole organ transplantation, Dr Allen undertook Australia’s first liver cell transplantation in 2004. While initially successful she subsequently provided scientific evidence that liver cell transplantation was not yet ready for long-term clinical application. She has held professorial rank at the University of Melbourne and University of Manchester, and in 2013 was appointed director of the Centre of Food and Allergy Research at the Murdoch Children's Research Institute (MCRI). Allen was the principal investigator for the MCRI's "HealthNuts" study, which is "the largest single-centre population based study of food allergy in children ever mounted". The study tracks 5,300 children who were diagnosed with food allergies as infants.

Allen has advocated for a wide range of preventive health care initiatives including better food labelling to help keep people with food allergy safe, dubbing Melbourne as “unfortunately the food allergy capital of the world”. Allen also led the national standardisation of Infant Feeding Guidelines in Australia, and led work to prevent genetic discrimination in the workplace. International expert Prof Paul Adams said of her Lancet publication “This study is a strong endorsement for the feasibility and acceptability of genetic testing for haemochromatosis in the workplace”.

Allen’s work with insurance companies was seminal in ensuring premiums were not increased as a result of genetic testing. Allen advocated that people who are screened for the disease should be rewarded not penalised. "This is the first test case really in the world to show that if we're sensible about this, genetic screening shouldn't translate automatically to genetic discrimination," she said.

In 2016, Allen described a link between Asian migration to Australia and increased risk of food allergy. “We know there are rising rates of migration from East Asia to Australia. Our finding that migration from Asia to Australia after birth can protect against early onset allergic disease such as food allergy provides a potent clue for us to follow when trying to understand why food allergy is on the rise.” Research undertaken at the Murdoch Children’s Research Institute suggested that the Asian environment is more protective of food allergies than the Australian environment, possibly due to variations in diet, bacteria or UV exposure. In 2017 Allen was featured on SBS Insight when she undertook Australia’s first paediatric Faecal Microbial Transplant.

Outside of her research, Allen has served as chair of the Melbourne Girls Grammar school council and as a director of Cabrini Health, a non-profit Catholic healthcare service.

In 2015 Allen was elected an Inaugural Fellow of the Australian Academy of Health and Medical Sciences.

Politics
Allen was the Liberal candidate in Prahran at the 2018 Victorian state election, losing to the incumbent Greens MP Sam Hibbins. In February 2019, she won preselection for the Division of Higgins, replacing the retiring MP Kelly O'Dwyer. She retained the seat for the Liberals at the 2019 federal election despite suffering a six percent swing–enough to drop the Liberal majority to 53 percent, making Higgins a marginal seat for the first time. Notably, she was the first Liberal candidate in Higgins to come up short of a majority on the first count, like several blue ribbon Liberal seats in inner cities around Australia.

Allen was sworn in as the Member for Higgins at the Opening of the 46th Parliament in Canberra, making her First Speech on 29 July 2019, where she spoke about ensuring a healthy and educated start to life for the next generation, an environmentally and economically sustainable future for all, lower taxes and a strong economy. Allen also noted familial ties to Margaret Bondfield – a British suffragette and the UK’s first woman cabinet minister as Minister for Labour.

Allen sat on the Parliamentary Standing Committees for Trade and Investment; the National Broadband Network; the Parliamentary Library; Industry, Innovation, Science and Resources and Communications and the Arts, and was a member of the National Redress Scheme Implementation Committee and Working Group on Indigenous Recognition. Allen visited PNG in August 2019 as part of a Parliamentary tour hosted by the Save the Children and Gates Foundation in the context of the Morrison Government Pacific Step.

Allen was also co convenor of the Parliamentary Friends of UNICEF, Parliamentary Friends of Child and Adolescent Health and Parliamentary Friends of Hemochromatosis, Parliamentary Friends of Young People and Parliamentary Friends of Cancer Care and Cure.

Allen was a member of the moderate faction of the Parliamentary Liberal Party.

Allen was defeated at the 2022 Australian federal election.

COVID-19 response 
Allen served on the National COVID-19 Health and Research Advisory Committee, working to provide advice on Australia’s health response to the COVID-19 pandemic to the Commonwealth Chief Medical Officer.

Policy interests 
Beyond health, Allen advocated within the Liberal Party for stronger action on climate change and how to achieve a carbon-neutral future.

Allen has been vocal on the need for education reform to support high achievers, support for rural GPs, Labor’s Medevac law, the prospect of tax on sugar-sweetened beverages tertiary education reform, and support for LGBT rights.

On 10 February 2022, Allen crossed the floor with four other Liberal MPs for an amendment to the Sex Discrimination Act to include protection for transgender students. However, reports said that Allen, together with fellow Liberal MP Dave Sharma, agreed to only cross the floor if their votes would not be decisive in defeating the Government on the issue. Allen did not join fellow Liberals Trent Zimmerman and Bridget Archer in crossing the floor against the bill’s controversial statements of belief clause. Ultimately Allen voted in favour of the final reading of the bill.

References

Living people
Liberal Party of Australia members of the Parliament of Australia
Members of the Australian House of Representatives
Members of the Australian House of Representatives for Higgins
Women members of the Australian House of Representatives
Australian people of British descent
Australian medical researchers
Monash University alumni
University of Melbourne alumni
Academic staff of the University of Melbourne
University of Melbourne women
People educated at Melbourne Girls Grammar
Australian gastroenterologists
Allergologists
Women medical researchers
Australian paediatricians
Women pediatricians
People who lost British citizenship
1966 births
Fellows of the Australian Academy of Health and Medical Sciences
People from Albury, New South Wales